Jean Marie Antoine Louis de Lanessan (13 July 1843 – 7 November 1919) was a French statesman and naturalist.

Biography
De Lanessan was born in Saint-André-de-Cubzac in the Gironde department of France and entered the French Navy in 1862, serving on the East African and Cochin-China stations in the medical department until the Franco-Prussian War, when he resigned and volunteered for the army medical service. He then completed his studies, taking his doctorate in 1872.

Elected to the Municipal Council of Paris in 1879, de Lanessan declared in favor of communal autonomy and joined with Henri Rochefort in demanding the erection of a monument to the Communards; but after his election to the Chamber of Deputies for the 5th arrondissement of Paris in 1881 he gradually veered from the extreme Radical party to the Republican Union, and identified himself with the cause of colonial expansion.

A government mission to the French colonies in 1886-1887, in connection with the approaching Paris exhibition, gave him the opportunity of studying colonial questions, on which, after his return, he published three works: La Tunisie (Paris, 1887); L'Expansion coloniale de la France (ib., 1888), L'Indo-Chine francaise (ib., 1889). In 1891 he was made civil and military governor of French Indochina, where his administration, which led to open rupture with Admiral Fournier, was severely criticized. Nevertheless, he consolidated French influence in Annam and Cambodia, and secured a large accession of territory on the Mekong River from the kingdom of Siam. He was recalled in 1894, and published an apology for his administration (La Colonisation francaise en Indo-Chine) in the following year.

In the Waldeck-Rousseau cabinet of 1899 to 1902 he was Minister of Marine, and in 1901 he secured the passage of a naval programme intended to raise the French navy during the next six years to a level befitting the place of France among the great powers. At the general election of 1906 he was not re-elected. He was political director of the Siècle, and president of the French Colonization Society, and wrote, besides the books already mentioned, various works on political and biological questions.

De Lanessan was an advocate of neo-Lamarckian evolution.

References

1843 births
1919 deaths
Lamarckism
People from Gironde
Politicians of the French Third Republic
Ministers of Marine
Governors-General of French Indochina